Stefan Figueiredo Pereira (born 16 April 1988) is a Brazilian professional footballer who currently plays as a forward for Hong Kong Premier League club Southern.

Career
On January 1, 2015 Pereira signed for Olimpic Sarajevo. Through the very last days of January to the beginning of April he scored a total of seven goals in seven matches, counting two friendly matches, two in the cup and three in the domestic league as well as five assists; three in two league matches and two in the cup.

On 17 July 2017, Pereira was officially announced as a Lee Man player during the club's first ever training session. It was revealed on 10 April 2018, that his contract with Lee Man would be extended for the 2018–19 season.

On 29 May 2019, Pereira announced his departure from Lee Man via social media.

In the new season, Pereira signed with Rangers and he was immediately loaned to Citizen. On 23 January 2020, after spending half of the season in the Hong Kong First Division, Pereira was called back by Rangers and returned to the HKPL.

On 6 June 2020, Southern announced the signing of Pereira.

Honours

Club
Olimpic Sarajevo
Bosnia and Herzegovina Football Cup: 2014–15
Lee Man 
Hong Kong Sapling Cup: 2018–19

References

External links

People from Brumado
1988 births
Living people
Brazilian footballers
Brazilian expatriate footballers
Association football forwards
Expatriate footballers in Romania
Expatriate footballers in Bosnia and Herzegovina
Expatriate footballers in Hong Kong
Liga I players
Premier League of Bosnia and Herzegovina players
Hong Kong Premier League players
Hong Kong First Division League players
FC Rapid București players
Citizen AA players
FK Olimpik players
Yuen Long FC players
Lee Man FC players
Hong Kong Rangers FC players
Southern District FC players
Sportspeople from Bahia